Aki Uusikartano (born June 13, 1977) is a retired Finnish professional ice hockey forward who played for Ässät of the SM-liiga.

References

External links

Living people
Ässät players
1977 births
Finnish ice hockey forwards